The French destroyer L’Adroit was the lead ship of her class of destroyers built for the French Navy during the 1920s.

Design and description
The L'Adroit class was a slightly enlarged and improved version of the preceding Bourrasque class. They were powered by two geared steam turbines, each driving one propeller shaft, using steam provided by three du Temple boilers.

The main armament of the L'Adroit-class ships consisted of four Canon de 130 mm Modèle 1924 guns in single mounts, one superfiring pair each fore and aft of the superstructure. Their anti-aircraft armament consisted of a pair of Canon de 37 mm Modèle 1925 guns. The ships carried two above-water triple sets of  torpedo tubes. A pair of depth charge chutes were built into their stern; these housed a total of sixteen  depth charges. In addition two depth charge throwers were fitted for which six  depth charges were carried.

Construction and career

L’Adroit ("the skilful one") was built at A C de France at Dunkirk. She was laid down on 26 May 1925, launched on 1 April 1927 and completed 1 July 1929. She was in action during the first months of World War II, and with the invasion of France and the Low Countries and was involved with the evacuation of the British and French forces from Dunkirk.

On 21 May 1940 she was critically damaged in an attack by German He 111 bombers. Captain Henri Dupin de Saint-Cyr beached the ship near the commune Malo-Les-Bains. Sitting on the beach, the wreck later suffered an explosion in the forward magazine, which created a huge gap between bridge and bow. All crewmembers survived.

Notes

References

External links
 L’Adroit at uboat.net

L'Adroit-class destroyers
World War II destroyers of France
1927 ships
Maritime incidents in May 1940
Destroyers sunk by aircraft
World War II shipwrecks in the English Channel
Ships built in France
Ships sunk by German aircraft
Naval magazine explosions